Corran Hocking (born ) is an Australian male weightlifter, competing in the +105 kg category and representing Australia at international competitions. He competed at world championships, most recently at the 2009 World Weightlifting Championships.

He was caught and suspended for using the doping benzylpiperazine.

Major results

References

1980 births
Living people
Australian male weightlifters
Place of birth missing (living people)
Doping cases in Australian weightlifting
Weightlifters at the 2010 Commonwealth Games
Commonwealth Games medallists in weightlifting
Weightlifters at the 2002 Commonwealth Games
Commonwealth Games silver medallists for Australia
Commonwealth Games bronze medallists for Australia
20th-century Australian people
21st-century Australian people
Medallists at the 2002 Commonwealth Games